Jacinta van Lint (born 27 March 1979) is an Australian freestyle swimmer who won a silver medal in the 4x200-metre freestyle relay at the 2000 Summer Olympics.

Training at the Australian Institute of Sport, van Lint swam in the heats, before the team of Susie O'Neill, Giaan Rooney, Kirsten Thomson and Petria Thomas trailed the United States team home in the final.

Following the Sydney 2000 Olympic Games, van Lint completed a bachelor's degree in arts and a master's degree in international studies at the University of Sydney, while competing and training with the University of Sydney club.

In 2013 van Lint completed a Certificate IV in Photoimaging, and now freelances as a photographer in Sydney and internationally.  Her broad travel and volunteer experiences, and her recent work with indigenous groups at the Aurora Project has positioned her to focus her photographic work around humanitarian issues, frequently working with not for profit organisations in Australia and internationally.

See also
 List of Olympic medalists in swimming (women)

References 

1979 births
Living people
Sportswomen from New South Wales
Sportspeople from Albury
Swimmers at the 2000 Summer Olympics
Olympic swimmers of Australia
Olympic silver medalists for Australia
Australian female freestyle swimmers
Australian Institute of Sport swimmers
Medalists at the FINA World Swimming Championships (25 m)
Swimmers from Sydney
Medalists at the 2000 Summer Olympics
Olympic silver medalists in swimming